IGR J17329-2731 as described by European Space Agency astronomers is a single faint transient X-ray source (ATel #10644) observed with Swift/XRT on 16 August 2017 from 2:26 to 2:45 UTC with an effective exposure of time of 1 ks. It was detected within the positional uncertainty provided by INTEGRAL IBIS imagery. It was described as the birth of a symbiotic X-ray binary, a "first" in the lifecycle of an interacting binary star, or a zombie neutron star brought back to life by its neighboring red giant. When first described in 2017, it was seen as an X-ray flare "from an unknown source" in the direction from the galactic (Milky Way) center.

See also
 IGR J11014-6103
 IGR J17091-3624

References

Notes

2017 in space
Astronomical events
Ophiuchus (constellation)
X-ray binaries